Sandy Cole (born 1953) is a former Republican member of the Illinois House of Representatives, representing the 62nd district for six years, from January 2007 until January 2013.

Illinois House of Representatives
Sandy Cole was elected to the Illinois House of Representatives on November 7, 2006. Cole was elected to serve the 62nd District, which represents all or portions of the central Lake County communities of Grayslake, Gurnee, Wildwood, Grandwood Park, Hainesville, Round Lake Beach, Round Lake Heights, Round Lake Park, Lake Villa, Lindenhurst, Wadsworth and Third Lake. Her election to the Illinois House followed her ten years of distinguished service on the Lake County Board, where she was a leader on a wide variety of issues from open space, environmental protection, and transportation. Sandy Cole served on the Lake County Board from 1996-2006 representing the 11th District.

During her service as State Representative, Sandy Cole has championed her "Family Focus" legislative agenda, a comprehensive list of legislative priorities aimed at improving the quality of life for families and communities in Lake County and throughout Illinois. Representative Cole has been a leader in the General Assembly on women's health issues, transportation, open space, fiscal responsibility, children's safety, and senior issues. Cole has also sponsored a number of community events; including an Autism Forum for families affected by children with autism, a Family Internet Safety Seminar for parents and their kids, and several outreach events for local senior citizens. Cole's committee assignments for the 95th General Assembly include the Adoption Reform, Appropriations-Elementary & Secondary Education, Bio-Technology, Environment & Energy, Human Services, and Renewable Energy committees.

The 62nd district's 2010 primary included endorsements from The Daily Herald, Chicago Tribune, and The Pioneer Press. On February 2, 2010, Representative Cole won her primary against Paul Mitchell and on November 2, 2010, she easily beat Democrat Rich Voltair in the general election.

She had no primary opponents for the 2012 election, but was defeated by Democrat Sam Yingling in the general election in November.

Civic involvement
Cole has also been committed throughout her life to civic involvement and volunteerism. Her civic activities have included service as a Volunteer Youth Leader for 4-H, an Assistant Coach for Township T-Ball & Softball, a University Of Ill. Extension Master Gardener, a Grayslake Greenery Garden Club member, a Voter Registrar, Republican Precinct Committeeman, a member of the Board of Directors for the Rockford College Alumni Association, a member of the Grayslake/Round Lake Area Exchange Club, and the Avon Township Youth Advisory Council.

Family
She earned her B.S. degree from Rockford College in 1976. She has lived in Lake County for 27 years and has been married to Stephen Cole for 25 years. Representative Cole and her husband have three children; two daughters and one son. Cole and her husband live in Grayslake.

References

External links
Chicago Tribune Questionnaire
Illinois General Assembly - Representative Sandy Cole (R) 62nd District official IL House website
Bills Committees
 
Profile at the Illinois House Republican Caucus

1953 births
Living people
Republican Party members of the Illinois House of Representatives
People from Grayslake, Illinois
Rockford University alumni
Women state legislators in Illinois
21st-century American politicians
21st-century American women politicians
County board members in Illinois